was a Japanese football player. He played for Japan national team. Lighting designer Motoko Ishii is his daughter.

Club career
Takeuchi was born in Tokyo on 6 November 1908. He played for Tokyo Imperial University LB was consisted of his alma mater Tokyo Imperial University players and graduates.

National team career

In May 1930, when Takeuchi was a Tokyo Imperial University student, he was selected Japan national team for 1930 Far Eastern Championship Games in Tokyo and Japan won the championship. At this competition, on 25 May, he debuted against Philippines. In 1936, he was selected Japan for 1936 Summer Olympics in Berlin and he played 2 games as Japan team captain. Japan completed a come-from-behind victory first game against Sweden. The first victory in Olympics for the Japan and the historic victory over one of the powerhouses became later known as "Miracle of Berlin" (ベルリンの奇跡) in Japan. In 2016, this team was selected Japan Football Hall of Fame. He played 4 games for Japan until 1936.

Death
In 1944, Takeuchi served in the military for World War II and was detained in the Soviet Union following the war (Japanese prisoners of war in the Soviet Union). On 12 April 1946, he died in a detention camp; the 20th POW camp in Siberia at the age of 37. In 2006, he was selected Japan Football Hall of Fame.

National team statistics

References

External links

 
 Japan National Football Team Database
Japan Football Hall of Fame at Japan Football Association
Japan Football Hall of Fame (Japan team at 1936 Olympics) at Japan Football Association

1908 births
1946 deaths
University of Tokyo alumni
Association football people from Tokyo
Japanese footballers
Japan international footballers
Olympic footballers of Japan
Footballers at the 1936 Summer Olympics
Association football defenders
Japanese military personnel of World War II
Japanese people who died in prison custody
Prisoners who died in Soviet detention
Siberian internees